With Samina Peerzada is a Pakistani web television talk show hosted by Samina Peerzada that first aired on 22 December 2017 on YouTube. The series was created by Peerzada in collaboration with Muhammad Adnan Butt, CEO Dot Republic Media. Each episode is separately sponsored and features a Pakistani celebrity interviewed by Peerzada about their journeys, struggles, challenges and success. Each season is titled differently.

Production
 
The series was developed by Muhammad Adnan Butt of Walnut Media and actress Samina Peerzada, explaining on series she said, "Adnan and I were figuring out how we could work together and I suggested that we begin with conducting interviews and possibly develop more projects such as web-series in the future. That’s pretty much how we started it out and I’m so happy that it’s being liked." Choosing digital media over television medium, Samina quipped, "I think that’s the future and being in the media, you need to be aware of what is happening around you and how the attention span is evolving. The internet has made it so convenient for me to watch shows that I’ve missed. After coming home from work, I catch up on whatever I’ve missed out on over YouTube, for instance I’m watching Manto now."

Episodes

Season 1: Rewind 
Season 1 first aired on 22 December 2017 and concluded on 4 May 2018, comprising a total of twenty-three episodes. Following guest appeared in the first season. 
 
 Ahsan Khan
 Mahira Khan
 Adnan Siddiqui
 Qurat-ul-Ain Balouch 
 Iftikhar Thakur 
 Momina Mustehsan
 Saieen Zahoor
 Ali Azmat
 Asim Azhar 
 Inzamam-ul-Haq
 Junaid Khan
 Imad Wasim
 Mustansar Hussain Tarar 
 Wahab Riaz
 Juggun Kazim
 Sana Mir 
 Sarmad Khoosat
 Shuja Haider
 Meera
 Muhammad Amer (a.k.a. Rahim Pardesi)
 Sania Saeed
 Sarah Khan
 Uzair Jaswal

Season 2: Speak Your Heart 
Season 2 premiered as Speak Your Heart on 10 May 2018 and concluded on 31 March 2019, comprising a total of sixty-six episodes. Following guest appeared in the second season.
 
 Aima Baig
 Hadiqa Kiani
 Mohsin Abbas Haider
 Bilal Khan
 Ushna Shah
 Sheheryar Munawar
 Salman Shahid
 Nabila
 Usman Peerzada
 Shuja Haider
 Maya Ali
 Fasih Bari Khan
 Mawra Hocane
 Ahmad Ali Butt 
 Natasha Khan (Pakistani Singer)
 Ali Noor
 Hina Altaf
 Wahab Riaz and Inzamam-ul-Haq
 Noor Khan
 Ayub Khawar
 Junaid Khan and Imad Wasim
 Rabia Butt
 Sheherezade Alam
 Imran Abbas
 Yousuf Salahuddin
 Sanam Baloch
 Nilofer Shahid
 Hira Mani
 Naeem Tahir
 Sarwat Gilani
 Zeb Bangash
 (live stream)
 Hassan Sheheryar Yasin
 Masarrat Misbah
 Sanam Saeed
 Ali Zafar
 Haseena Moin
 Haissam Hussain
 Atif Aslam
 Komal Aziz Khan
 Agha Ali
 Bilal Abbas Khan
 Ali Abbas
 Tahira Syed
 Iqra Aziz
 Omair Rana
 Faizan Haqquee
 Sonya Hussyn
 Amjad Islam Amjad
 R M Naeem
 Faran Tahir
 Jawad Bashir
 Asma Abbas
 Rehan Sheikh
 Khalid Malik
 Nadia Afghan
 Moneeza Hashmi
 Munib Nawaz
 Reema Khan  
 Fauzia Saeed
 Fahad Hussain
 Gohar Mumtaz
 Imran Qureshi
 Uzma Gillani  
 Amanat Ali
 Guddu

Season 3: Rewind 
Season 3 was renamed as Rewind again and premiered on 2 April 2019 and till now it has aired twenty-two episodes 
 
 Savera Nadeem 
 Nimra Khan 
 Aiman Khan 
 Mani  
 Yumna Zaidi 
 Affan Wahid 
 Nabeel Shaukat 
 Ramiz Raja 
 Syed Jibran
 Samina Ahmed 
 Emmad Irfani
 Nadia Jamil 
 Adeel Hussain
 Muneeb Butt
 Faisal Rehman 
 Marina Khan
 Usman Mukhtar
 Jibran Nasir
 Hareem Farooq
 Anoosh Masood
 Asghar Nadeem Syed
 Minal Khan

References

External links
  

2018 Pakistani television series debuts
Urdu-language television shows
Variety television series
Digital media
Pakistani web series
Streaming television